The ADI Bumble Bee (sometimes Hollmann Bumble Bee) is an ultralight gyrocopter marketed by Aircraft Designs Inc (ADI). It was the first of its kind when it flew in 1983 and is still available in plans form for homebuilding.

It was designed by Martin Hollmann after a back injury (sustained in the crash of the ADI Condor) prevented him from flying his previous design (the ADI Sportster) on account of not being able to lift the rotor assembly.

Design and development

The aircraft consists of an open frame based on a keel tube, which supports the nose wheel at the front and the tail at the back. The pilot's seat, the engine and rotor assembly are bolted to the same keel tube. A control stick cyclically controls rotor pitch angle. The  Kawasaki 440 engine has also been used. The landing gear is of tricycle configuration, uses plastic-spoked wheels to reduce weight and does not include suspension. A horizontal tailplane maintains the aircraft pitch angle in flight and a large fin and rudder is provided. The main rotor system is of low-inertia and requires pilot skill to manage energy on landing.

The aircraft plans cost US$160 in 2001. Construction time is estimated as 400 hours, much of which is consumed fabricating the composite rotor blades.

Specifications (ADI Bumble Bee)

References

Homebuilt aircraft
1980s United States ultralight aircraft
Bumble Bee
Single-engined pusher autogyros